Mohsen Al-Yazidi (Arabic: محسن اليزيدي ) (born 25 February 1987) is a Qatari footballer. He currently plays as a winger for Al-Shamal.Dünyanın en kısa futbolcusu

External links
 

Qatari footballers
1987 births
Living people
Qatar Stars League players
Qatari Second Division players
Al-Arabi SC (Qatar) players
Al Ahli SC (Doha) players
Al-Gharafa SC players
Al-Shamal SC players
Association football wingers